Pavin Joe Smith (born February 6, 1996) is an American professional baseball first baseman and right fielder for the Arizona Diamondbacks of Major League Baseball (MLB). He played college baseball for the Virginia Cavaliers.

Amateur career
Pavin participated in the Babe Ruth League's 2008 Cal Ripken Major70 World Series. His two home runs in the World Championship helped his Jupiter, Florida, team defeat Mexico 5–4. Smith attended Palm Beach Gardens Community High School in Palm Beach Gardens, Florida. He played for the school's baseball team as a first baseman and pitcher. The Colorado Rockies selected him in the 32nd round of the 2014 MLB draft, but he did not sign.

Smith enrolled at the University of Virginia to play college baseball for the Virginia Cavaliers baseball team. He played the 2015 season with an ulnar collateral ligament injury of the elbow, which prevented him from pitching. Smith had the game-winning hit in the second game of the 2015 College World Series against Vanderbilt. Smith underwent Tommy John surgery after Virginia won the College World Series, and returned to play in 2016. He hit eight home runs as a sophomore. After the 2016 season, he played collegiate summer baseball for the Harwich Mariners of the Cape Cod Baseball League, and was named a league all-star. In 2017, his junior year, Smith batted .342 with 13 home runs and 12 strikeouts.

Professional career
The Arizona Diamondbacks selected Smith with the seventh overall selection of the 2017 MLB draft. Smith signed with the Diamondbacks, receiving a $5,016,300 signing bonus.

Smith made his professional debut with the Hillsboro Hops of the Class A-Short Season Northwest League and spent his whole first season there, posting a .318 batting average with 27 runs batted in (RBIs) over 51 games. He was named a postseason All-Star. Smith spent the 2018 season with the Visalia Rawhide of the Class A-Advanced California League where he hit .255 with 11 home runs and 54 RBIs over 120 games. After the 2018 season, he played in the Arizona Fall League. Smith spent 2019 with the Jackson Generals of the Class AA Southern League. Over 123 games, he slashed .291/.370/.466 with 12 home runs and 67 RBIs.

On September 10, 2020, the Diamondbacks selected Smith's contract to the 40-man and active rosters. He made his major league debut on September 12 against the Seattle Mariners, and he notched his first hit off of Yoshihisa Hirano. On September 25, Smith hit his first major league home run off of A. J. Ramos of the Colorado Rockies.

Personal life
His father is a sports agent who once had the golfer Corey Pavin as a client. Smith is named after the golfer.

As a Christmas present in 2017, Smith paid off his parents' mortgage. Smith is married to former University of Florida gymnast Amanda Cheney.

References

External links

Living people
1996 births
People from Jupiter, Florida
Major League Baseball first basemen
Baseball players from Florida
Arizona Diamondbacks players
Virginia Cavaliers baseball players
Harwich Mariners players
Hillsboro Hops players
Visalia Rawhide players
Jackson Generals (Southern League) players
Salt River Rafters players
American expatriate baseball players in the Dominican Republic
Tigres del Licey players
Reno Aces players